Horsfieldia ampliformis is a small rainforest tree in the family Myristicaceae, endemic to Papua New Guinea. It is only known to exist in the former Sepik Province (now East Sepik and Sandaun Provinces) and Morobe Province, where it grows in rainforests in the foothills and low areas of mountains.

References

Flora of Papua New Guinea
ampliformis
Vulnerable plants
Taxonomy articles created by Polbot